The table below lists the early Hindu-Muslim military conflicts in the Indian subcontinent.

( Color legend for aggressor)

References

Military lists
Military history of Islam
Hinduism and violence